Hermann Walter Kerckhoff (born December 27, 1937, in Berlin, Germany) is a Canadian retired slalom canoeist who competed in the early 1970s. He finished 37th in the K-1 event at the 1972 Summer Olympics in Munich.

See also

 List of German Canadians

References
 

1937 births
Canoeists from Berlin
Canadian male canoeists
Canoeists at the 1972 Summer Olympics
Living people
Olympic canoeists of Canada
German emigrants to Canada